The 2009 European Championship of Ski Mountaineering was the eighth European Championship of ski mountaineering and was held in Alpago (Tambre, Italy) from February 19, 2009 to February 24, 2009. The competition was organized by the International Ski Mountaineering Federation (ISMF), successor organization of the International Council for Ski Mountaineering Competitions (ISMC).

Results

Nation ranking and medals 
(all age groups)

Vertical race 
Event held on February 20, 2009

List of the best 10 participants by gender:

Relay 
Event held on February 21, 2009

List of the best 10 teams by gender:

Team 
Event held on February 22, 2009

List of the best 10 teams by gender:

Individual 
Event held on February 24, 2009

List of the best 10 participants by gender:

Combination ranking 
combined ranking (results of the individual, team and vertical race events)

List of the best 10 participants by gender:

External links 
 www.alpago2009.org

References 

2009
Championship of Ski Mountaineering
International sports competitions hosted by Italy
Championship of Ski Mountaineering